Andrews Avenue (formerly and still commonly known as Nichols Road) is a major east-west thoroughfare in Metro Manila, Philippines that functions as a metropolitan linkage between Pasay and Taguig. It runs underneath the NAIA Expressway almost parallel to Epifanio de los Santos Avenue (EDSA) to the north connecting Roxas Boulevard and Domestic Road near Bay City with South Luzon Expressway near Newport City.

Andrews Avenue also serves as the main feeder to Ninoy Aquino International Airport from the east and west and is the main access road to Newport World Resorts (formerly Resorts World Manila).

Route description
Andrews Avenue follows the old route of Nichols Road in Pasay and is split into three sections.

Sales Road
At its eastern terminus, the route begins as Sales Road at the Sales Interchange with the South Luzon Expressway. It is a continuation of Lawton Avenue from Fort Bonifacio via the Sales Bridge and a roundabout. This section ends with another roundabout beneath the NAIA Expressway's off-ramp just before the road makes a sharp bend to the west.

Andrews Avenue
The main section of Andrews Avenue is an eight-lane divided arterial that runs along the northern perimeter of the airport. From the roundabout across from the Philippine Air Force Aerospace Museum, the avenue continues along the southern side of Newport City, a mixed-use development facing the NAIA Terminal 3. It passes the integrated resort complex of Newport World Resorts, the Star Cruises Centre and the Shrine of St. Therese before reaching a large roundabout, which used to have a prominent "egg structure" in the middle until 2015, called Circulo del Mundo. Access to the airport terminal is via this roundabout which also serves as a boundary between Newport and the older barangays of Pasay. From the former Circulo down to the intersection with Domestic Road, the avenue is lined with airline offices and maintenance facilities including Philippine Airlines, as well as a few barangays in between. The Manila Light Rail Transit facilities are also located in this intersection before the avenue becomes known as Airport Road.

Airport Road
West of Domestic Road and a small creek called Estero de Tripa de Gallina, the road enters the Baclaran area of Parañaque. The road narrows into a four-lane undivided road carrying one-way westbound traffic. The road meets its western terminus at Roxas Boulevard.

History

The avenue was formerly called Nichols Field Road, later shortened to Nichols Road, after the US air base in Pasay which it served. Nichols Field, in turn, was named after Captain Henry E. Nichols, a US Navy commander of monitor ship USS Monadnock during the Philippine–American War. The air base was built in 1912 and the road to Fort McKinley (now Fort Bonifacio) and to Dewey Boulevard (now Roxas Boulevard) was constructed shortly thereafter. The whole stretch from Dewey to Fort McKinley was named Nichols Road.

At present, the Fort Bonifacio/Taguig portion is named Lawton Avenue. In Pasay, the longest portion has been renamed to Andrews Avenue, after Frank Maxwell Andrews, the United States Army general officer during World War II and one of the founders of the United States Army Air Force.

Points of interest

 Circulo del Mundo (demolished to make way for NAIA Expressway)
 Civil Aviation Authority of the Philippines
 Fort Bonifacio
 Marriott Hotel Manila
 Maxims Hotel
 Newport Mall
 Newport World Resorts
 Ninoy Aquino International Airport Terminal 3
 Philippine Air Force Aerospace Museum
 Philippine Air Force General Hospital
 Remington Hotel
 Shrine of St. Therese
 Star Cruises Centre
 Villamor Air Base
 Villamor Golf Course

See also
 Lawton Avenue
 Nichols Field

References

Streets in Metro Manila